Who Will Love My Children? is a 1983 American made-for-television biographical film based on the life of Lucile Fray. Lucile Fray was diagnosed with cancer in 1952 and wanted to find suitable homes for her ten children, since she felt her husband could not properly care for them. Prior to her death, she succeeded. The film was directed by John Erman, written by Michael Bortman, and starred Ann-Margret in her first television film. It was originally broadcast on ABC.

The same evening as its original broadcast, February 14, 1983, the children of Lucile Fray appeared on That's Incredible!, an ABC program. The film was remade in Turkish as Yavrularım in 1984, in Malayalam as Akashadoothu in 1993  which went on to be remade in Telugu as Matru Devo Bhava, in Kannada as Karulina Koogu, in Marathi as Chimani Pakhare and in Hindi as Tulsi.

Cast
 Ann-Margret as  Lucile Fray
 Frederic Forrest as  Ivan Fray
 Cathryn Damon as  Hazel Anderson
 Donald Moffat as  Dick Thomas
 Lonny Chapman as  Milton Hammond
 Patricia Smith as  Cleta Thomas
 Jess Osuna as  Dr. Willis
 Christopher Allport as  Kenneth Handy

The Fray children
 Patrick Brennan as  Carl Fray
 Soleil Moon Frye as  Linda Fray
 Tracey Gold as  Pauline Fray
 Joel Graves as  Warren Fray
Rachel Jacobs as  Joyce Fray
 Robby Kiger as  Frank Fray
 Cady McClain as  Virginia Fray
 Hallie Todd as  Joann Fray
 Cory Yothers as  Ivan Fray Jr.
 Kyle Chapman, Wade Chapman, and Brian Mazzanti as Stephen Fray

Awards & nominations
1983 Emmy Awards
Outstanding Directing in a Limited Series Or A Special — John Erman
Nominated
Outstanding Achievement in Makeup — Zoltan Elek and Monty Westmore
Outstanding Achievement in Music Composition for a Limited Series or a Special (Dramatic Underscore) — Laurence Rosenthal
Outstanding Drama Special — Paula Levenback and Wendy Riche
Outstanding Film Editing for a Limited Series or a Special — Jerrold L. Ludwig
Outstanding Film Sound Editing for a Limited Series or a Special — Michael Hilkene, Rusty Tinsley, Bill Jackson, Joseph A. Mayer, Jill Taggart, and Ben Wong
Outstanding Lead Actress in a Limited Series or a Special — Ann-Margret
Outstanding Writing in a Limited Series or a Special — Michael Bortman
1984 American Cinema Editors Award
Best Edited Television Special — Jerrold L. Ludwig
1984 Directors Guild of America Award
Outstanding Directorial Achievement in Dramatic Specials — John Erman (nominated)
1984 Golden Globe Awards
Golden Globe Award for Best Performance by an Actress In A Mini-series or Motion Picture Made for Television — Ann-Margret
Nominated
Best Mini-Series or Motion Picture Made for TV

References

External links

 TV: Ann-Margret Plays a Dying Mother of 10 at the New York Times

Films directed by John Erman
1983 television films
1983 films
ABC network original films
Films about cancer
American television films
American biographical drama films
Biographical television films
Films scored by Laurence Rosenthal
1980s American films